Cymaria is a genus of plants in the family Lamiaceae, first described in 1830. It is native to China, New Guinea, and Southeast Asia.

Species
Cymaria dichotoma Benth. – (syn Cymaria acuminata Decne.) – Hainan, Indochina, Malaysia, Java, Maluku, Philippines, New Guinea
Cymaria elongata Benth. – Myanmar, Bali, Lombok, Timor

References

Lamiaceae
Lamiaceae genera